Lachesis muta rhombeata, also known as the Atlantic Forest bushmaster, is a venomous pit viper subspecies endemic to the Atlantic Forest of Brazil.

References

muta rhombeata
Endemic fauna of Brazil